A desktop publishing artist or artworker is a desktop publishing worker, responsible for translating the work of art directors and graphic designers into digital files ready to go to print or be placed online. A DTP operator is usually skilled in multiple computer design applications, such as Adobe CS.

This job description is used in advertising agencies, publishing, color separation, printing and related industries. DTP operators were formerly known as FA artists (FA: Finished artwork); the name changed with the introduction of digital processes.

See also
 Production artist
 Graphic designers
 Visualizer (advertising)
 Art director

Visual arts occupations
Advertising occupations